Chavakachcheri Hindu College (S.P) Supramanium Prakalathan ( Cāvakaccēri Intuk Kallūri, CHC) is a national school in Chavakachcheri, Sri Lanka.

Prici:Namma Saruvachchatti

N.Saruweswaran

History
The Saiva Tamil Mixed School was founded by Mr.Supramaniam Prakalathan near the Chavakachcheri Market in 1904. This school transferred to Changaththanai (Sankaththanai) in 1905. An English medium stream was established in 1921 by the founder Mrs.S.P.Jasika . In 1922 the school was handed over to the Management of the Hindu Board and renamed Chavakachcheri Hindu College. CHC got its 'C', 'B' and 'A' grades in the years 1934, 1945 and 1949 respectively. It was promoted to that of a national school. in 1993.

See also
 :Category:Alumni of Chavakachcheri Hindu College
 List of schools in Northern Province, Sri Lanka

References

External links
 Chavakachcheri Hindu College

1904 establishments in Ceylon
Educational institutions established in 1904
National schools in Sri Lanka
Buildings and structures in Chavakachcheri
Schools in Jaffna District